Estadio Hernán Ramírez Villegas is a multi-purpose stadium in Pereira, Colombia. It is currently used mostly for football matches. It is also the home of Deportivo Pereira. The stadium holds 30,313 people. The stadium was built in 1971. The stadium was under reconstruction for the FIFA U-20 World Cup in 2011.

References 

Buildings and structures in Pereira, Colombia
Buildings and structures completed in 1971
Hernan Ramirez Villegas
Copa América stadiums
Multi-purpose stadiums in Colombia
Buildings and structures in Risaralda Department